Ashendon is a small village and civil parish in Buckinghamshire, England. It is about nine miles west of Aylesbury and seven miles north of Thame.

The toponym is derived from the Old English for "Hill overgrown with ash trees". The Domesday Book of 1086 records the village as the property of the Grenville family; it was called Assedune. The original name refers to the fact that in Saxon times this area was forested, serving as hunting land for the king.

In recent times the manor of Ashendon passed into the hands of the Marquis of Buckingham.

Included in with the parish of Ashendon are the hamlets of Upper Pollicott and Lower Pollicott. The names of these hamlets derive from the Anglo-Saxon Pol's Cottage.

In the less distant past, Ashendon was an entirely farming village and, at present, there is still much agricultural activity within the village. However, some of the farmhouses have been converted into private residences, the best example of this being Ashendon Farm and its barns. Although Ashendon is a small village, in comparison with many nearby Buckinghamshire villages, it has a pub, a recreational playing field, a church and a thriving social club.

In former times this route was used by express trains between London Marylebone, Leicester and Sheffield.

References

External links

UK & Ireland Genealogy

Villages in Buckinghamshire
Civil parishes in Buckinghamshire